Blockbuster (colloquially known as The Last Blockbuster) is a video rental store in Bend, Oregon. In 2019, it became the world's last remaining retail store using the Blockbuster brand.

History 

Located at the intersection of U.S. Route 20 and Revere Avenue, the Blockbuster in Bend, Oregon, was opened by Ken and Debbie Tisher in 1992 as the second location of Pacific Video, a small video rental store chain in the state. In 2000, Tisher converted it into a Blockbuster franchise store. Sandi Harding has been the general manager since 2004.

Blockbuster LLC closed all of its corporate-owned stores by early 2014, leaving the Bend location as one of 50 remaining franchise stores. In July 2018, it became the last remaining Blockbuster in the United States, and in March 2019, the last in the world. Dish Network, the owner of the Blockbuster trademark, no longer grants new franchises with the Blockbuster name, which has cemented the Bend store's status as the last Blockbuster. As of December 2022, “The Last Blockbuster” is one of three remaining video rental stores that are in operation throughout North America, its only competitor being Canada's Jumbo Video.

The location has become a popular tourist destination since becoming the last Blockbuster. Ken Tisher, who still owns the store, continues to license the Blockbuster trademark from Dish Network on a yearly basis, which also allows the location to sell merchandise using the name. The store stocks around 1,200 titles and has an estimated 4,000 members who regularly rent movies.

In 2018, a local brewery, 10 Barrel, released a dark ale celebrating the store, named The Last Blockbuster (with flavor hints of red licorice); it was released at a block party celebrating the store (when it had become the last in the U.S.). The Ellen DeGeneres Show visited the store for a prank hidden camera segment in May 2019 (when it had become the last Blockbuster in the world). The store is the subject of the 2020 documentary film The Last Blockbuster, created by Bend filmmakers and featuring various celebrities, such as Kevin Smith, Brian Posehn, and Ione Skye; it was released for sale and rent on DVD and VHS, as well as for streaming on Netflix.

The store continued to operate without laying off staff during the COVID-19 pandemic. It hosted sleepovers via Airbnb in September 2020.

The store was featured as a central plot point in the second episode of the 21st season of Family Guy, titled "Bend or Blockbuster". The Netflix sitcom Blockbuster (2022), starring Randall Park and Melissa Fumero, is based on a fictionalized version of the last-remaining Blockbuster.

In 2023, the store released a commercial on Instagram and for rent on a VHS tape during the Super Bowl LVII halftime show (when it was played inside the store). The ad features a lone cockroach journeying across the aftermath of an apparent global catastrophe until it arrives at the last Blockbuster, which is still open. The store saw an uptick in sales following the ad's release.

Memorabilia 
The store displays several pieces of film memorabilia that formerly belonged to actor Russell Crowe, including his hood from Robin Hood (2010), robe and shorts from Cinderella Man (2005), vest from Les Misérables (2012), and director's chairs from American Gangster (2007). The pieces were gifted from the last operating Alaskan Blockbuster in Anchorage following its closure in July 2018. The items were originally donated to the Alaska store for an April 2018 segment of Last Week Tonight with John Oliver.

See also
Cinephilia
Family Video
Free Blockbuster

References

External links

 https://bendblockbuster.com/

Buildings and structures in Bend, Oregon
Blockbuster LLC
Tourist attractions in Bend, Oregon
1992 establishments in Oregon